Nersesyan or Nersesian is an Armenian surname. Notable people with the surname include:

Anahit Nersesyan (born 1954), Armenian classical pianist
Arthur Nersesian, American writer, playwright and poet
Sebouh Nersesian (1872–1940), Armenian general
Anry Nersessian, Armenian mathematician

See also
Nerses (disambiguation)

Armenian-language surnames